This page is a glossary of library and information science.

A

B

C

D

E

F

I

J

K

L

M

O

P

R

S

T

W

References

Library and information science
 
Wikipedia glossaries using description lists